The 1942 Campeonato Paulista da Primeira Divisão, organized by the Federação Paulista de Futebol, was the 41st season of São Paulo's top professional football league. Palmeiras won the title for the 9th time, its first title under its new name. no teams were relegated and the top scorer was Corinthians's Milani with 24 goals.

Championship
The championship was disputed in a double-round robin system, with the team with the most points winning the title.

Top Scorers

References

Campeonato Paulista seasons
Paulista